Lars Edvard Phragmén (2 September 1863 Örebro – 13 March 1937) was a Swedish mathematician. 

The son of a college professor, he studied at Uppsala then Stockholm, graduating from Uppsala in 1889. He became professor at Stockholm in 1892, after Sofia Kovalevskaia.

He left Uppsala less than a year after, becoming professor Mittag-Leffler's assistant at Stockholm. In 1884, he provided a new proof of the Cantor-Bendixson theorem.

His work focused on elliptic functions and complex analysis. His most famous result is the extension of Liouville's theorem to analytic functions on a sector. A first version was proposed by Phragmén, then improved by the Finnish mathematician Ernst Lindelöf. They jointly published this last version, known as the Phragmén–Lindelöf principle.

He left the university in 1903, joining the Royal Inspection of Insurance Companies. He became director the following year. In 1908, he was appointed director of the insurance company Allmänna Lifförsakringsbolaget.

From 1889 until his death, he was an active editor of Acta Mathematica. He is also famous for having pointed out (at 26) an unclear part of Henri Poincaré's preprint on the three-body problem. This led Poincaré to discover a major mistake in his own work, paving the way to important developments in chaos theory.

In addition to analysis, Phragmén was interested in the mathematics underlying insurance companies, and voting.

See also

Phragmen–Brouwer theorem
Phragmen-Lindelof principle
Phragmen's voting rules

References 

 Yngve Domar, « Mathematical research during the first decades of the University of Stockholm », Stockholm University, 1978 (written and translated by H. Troy and H.S. Shapiro)

External links
Biography

Swedish mathematicians
Academic staff of Stockholm University
Members of the Royal Swedish Academy of Sciences
1863 births
1937 deaths